Jack Dempsey (1895–1983) was a heavyweight boxing champion.

Jack Dempsey may also refer to:

Sports
Jack Dempsey (wrestler) (1920–2007), British wrestler
Jack "Nonpareil" Dempsey (1862–1896), Irish-born middleweight boxing champion
Jack Dempsey (Australian footballer) (1919–2006), Australian rules footballer
Jack Dempsey (American football) (1913–1988), American football tackle
Jack Dempsey (rugby union) (born 1994), Australian rugby player
Jack Dempsey (Gaelic footballer) (1878–1913), Irish Gaelic footballer
Jack Dempsey (rugby league) (1907–1951), Australian rugby league player

Other uses
Jack Frost (musician) (born 1968), American guitarist, born Jack Dempsey
Ken Goldstein (born 1969), aka Jack Dempsey, American filmmaker, occasional actor and musician
Jack Dempsey (politician) (born 1966), Australian politician
Jack Dempsey (fish), a species of cichlid

See also 
Jack Dempsey's Broadway Restaurant, New York City restaurant 
John Dempsey (disambiguation)

Dempsey, Jack